Cheliferidae is a family of pseudoscorpions in the order Pseudoscorpiones. There are at least 60 genera and 270 described species in Cheliferidae.

Genera

References

Further reading

 
 

 
Cheliferoidea
Pseudoscorpion families